Viseu is a Brazilian municipality in the state of Pará. It is located at an altitude of 15 meters. Its estimated population in 2021 was 62,093 inhabitants according to IBGE. It has an area of 4,972.897 km2 and, thus, the population density of 12.57 inhabitants/km2. Most people are Catholic, according to the Brazilian Institute of Geography and Statistics (IBGE). The municipal HDI is 0.515. The lands visuenses were discovered around June 24, 1531 by the navigator Diogo Leite.

There is also a Vila Nazaré known as the village of km 74 that is part of Viseu. It is where there are some loggers of the region. With two Schools, Mail, Medical Office, CRÁS, ADEPARÁ, The beautiful church of St. Benedict, One of the founders of the Village still alive "Sr Alves" Patron of the Alves Family.

History 

The first navigator to land in Portugal was Diogo Leite in 1531, commanded by Martim Afonso de Sousa, who entered the bar of the Gurupi and Turiaçu rivers, commanding two vessels named Princess and Rosa, a fact corroborated by the historians Francisco Adolfo de Varnhagen (Visconde Porto Seguro) and Maurício Martins Meireles.

Diogo Leite gave his name to an open, which until today is the subject of discussions among historians, who have doubts about the location of this open: for some (like the Visconde of Porto Seguro) it would be at the mouth of the Gurupi river; for others like Jaime Cortesão D'Avezac, it would be located in the river Turiaçu. The location of the Abra and not the arrival of that navigator at the mouth of the Gurupi River as early as 1531 is discussed, since they are quite plausible in stating that he actually arrived in the present lands of the municipality of Viseu, of the foundation of the city of Belém and 103 years before the foundation of Sousa do Caeté (present Bragança, which was founded only in 1634).

Situated in the Gurupi area, it was originally inhabited by the Tupinambás, Tremembés and Apotiangas Indians. In the 19th century, the Urubus-Kaapor Indians, considered a warlike and violent nation, migrated to the Gurupi, and there were numerous conflicts involving these Indians, the region's black quilombos and the whites.

The French began to settle in Maranhão around 1594 and remained there until they were expelled and left definitively on November 3, 1615, after being surrounded by troops under the command of Alexandre de Moura. Before that, in 1613, the then Governor General Gaspar de Sousa sent an expedition to the region under the command of Diogo de Campos, who persuaded Jerônimo de Albuquerque to build a fort on the Piriá River in order to establish alliances with the Tremembes Indians.

After the victory of the Portuguese in the region, the Kingdom began a real process of occupation of the region to avoid new invasions. It was in this way that through the Royal Charter of February 9, 1622, King Philip III of Spain (remember the Iberian Union) donated the Captaincy of the Gurupi to Gaspar de Sousa, which ran from the river Caeté to the river Turiaçu, having 20 leagues in the background. According to the archives of the Historical and Geographical Institute of Pará, the Royal Charter of Felipe III of 1622 gave Gaspar de Sousa the legitimate right to choose a place or place of the Captaincy to benefit and make it populate. However, Gaspar de Sousa died without defining the place or place in which he preferred to fix his concession.

In 1624, a Paradox (dated March 19, 1624) of King Felipe III ordered Francisco Coelho de Carvalho (then Governor of Maranhão) to distribute the lands of Maranhão to the settlers and cultivators who wanted them.

The first settlement on the bank of the Gurupi River, which was named Vera Cruz, was only definitively founded in April 1627, on the orders of Francisco Coelho de Carvalho, and was composed of Indians and dwellers who were taken from Pará and Maranhão. In 1758, three parishes were founded in the municipality of Viseu, which remained where today is the city of Viseu, São José do Gurupi and São José do Piriá (founded in 1751 by the governor Francisco Xavier de Mendonça Furtado).

In 1655, Father Antônio Vieira founded the Jesuit mission of St. John the Baptist in the Gurupi River (more precisely in the town of Vera Cruz), which remained in that village until 1672, when it was transferred to Caeté.

Vera Cruz was founded to be a connecting city between Bethlehem and St. Louis. Because the port of Vera Cruz was very shallow, the town was eventually abandoned by the rulers. This fact helped the migration of people from Vera Cruz to Sousa do Caeté.

Although its lands were known from 1531 and received the visit of French and Portuguese in 1613, the city of Viseu was only definitively occupied in Century XVIII, having in 1758, was founded a parish. In 1781, the founding of the present city of Viseu was officialized, according to the letter of January 27, 1781, of the Governor of Pará, José de Nápoles Tello de Menezes to the Minister and Secretary of State, Martinho de Melo e Castro:

"... I had the honor of increasing with a new settlement called Viseu on the north bank of the Gurupi river ..."

References 

Populated places established in 1953
Populated coastal places in Pará
Municipalities in Pará